Siliqi is an Albanian surname. Notable people with the surname include:

 Drago Siliqi (1930–1963), Albanian poet
 Llazar Siliqi (1924–2001), Albanian poet
 Risto Siliqi (1882–1936), Albanian poet
 Teodor Siliqi, Albanian chess master

Albanian-language surnames